Sansa is a Buddhist mountain monastery in Korea. Seven of them are designated as UNESCO World Cultural Heritage. With the country being largely mountainous and Buddhism deeply rooted in its history, there are many Sansas across the country.  

The word Sansa is composed of two words san and sa which mean mountain and monastery/temple.

World Heritage listed Sansas

See also 

 Korean Buddhist temples
 UNESCO's page for Sansa

References 

World Heritage Sites in South Korea
Buddhist temples in South Korea
Korean traditions
Korean culture